Glen W. Harmeson (March 9, 1908 – June 23, 1983) was an American football player, coach of football and basketball, and college athletics administrator.  He served as the head football coach at Lehigh University (1934–1941), Wabash College (1946–1950), and Arkansas State College—now Arkansas State University (1954), compiling a career college football record of 49–60–11.  Harmeson was also the head basketball coach at Lehigh from 1934 to 1937 and at Wabash from 1950 to 1951, tallying a career college basketball mark of 20–43.

Harmeson was a high school star in basketball, football, and baseball for Indianapolis' Emmerich Manual High School; he was awarded three varsity letters in each of three high school sports and was a three-time All-State basketball player.

During his intercollegiate career at Purdue, Harmeson was named all-Big Ten Conference in basketball, football, and baseball; he was a co-captain for the 1930 Big Ten champion basketball team with Stretch Murphy and a teammate of John Wooden and was a member of the 1928 Big Ten champions.  He led the Boilermakers to the 1929 Big Ten title in football, quarterbacking them to a perfect record of  8–0 (5–0 in conference), outscoring the opposition 187–44.  He was the first Purdue athlete to play on two teams in same academic year that posted undefeated conference marks.  As a freshman at Purdue, he was awarded four freshman letters.

He was inducted into the Indiana Basketball Hall of Fame in 1981.

Coaching career

Lehigh
Harmeson was the 18th head football coach at Lehigh University in Bethlehem, Pennsylvania and he held that position for eight seasons, from 1934 until 1941. His record at Lehigh was 23–42–5.

Wabash
Harmeson's next coaching move was to become the 23rd head football coach at Wabash College in Crawfordsville, Indiana and he held that position for five seasons, from 1946 until 1950.  His coaching record at Wabash was 25–10–6.

Arkansas State
Harmeson coached the Arkansas State University football team for the 1954 season.  After concluding with a record of 1–8, he retired from coaching.

Later life and death
Harmeson worked at the Indiana Veterans Home from 1966 until 1978.  He died on June 23, 1983, at St. Elizabeth Hospital in Lafayette, Indiana.

Head coaching record

Football

References

External links
 

1908 births
1983 deaths
American football quarterbacks
Baseball outfielders
Arkansas State Red Wolves football coaches
Lehigh Mountain Hawks athletic directors
Lehigh Mountain Hawks football coaches
Lehigh Mountain Hawks men's basketball coaches
Purdue Boilermakers baseball players
Purdue Boilermakers football coaches
Purdue Boilermakers football players
Purdue Boilermakers men's basketball players
Wabash Little Giants basketball coaches
Wabash Little Giants football coaches
Coaches of American football from Indiana
Players of American football from Indianapolis
Baseball players from Indianapolis
Basketball coaches from Indiana
Basketball players from Indianapolis